Route 122 is an east/west highway on the south shore of the Saint Lawrence River in Quebec, Canada. Its western terminus is at the junction of Route 132 in Yamaska and the eastern terminus is in Victoriaville at the junction of Route 116. The highway acts mainly as the main link between Drummondville and Sorel-Tracy, and somewhat as a major link between Victoriaville and Drummondville.

Municipalities along Route 122
 Yamaska
 Saint-Gérard-Majella
 Saint-David
 Saint-Guillaume
 Saint-Bonaventure
 Saint-Edmond-de-Grantham
 Saint-Germain-de-Grantham
 Drummondville (Drummondville, Saint-Charles-de-Drummond)
 Saint-Cyrille-de-Wendover
 Notre-Dame-du-Bon-Conseil (Parish)
 Notre-Dame-du-Bon-Conseil (Village)
 Sainte-Clotilde-de-Horton
 Saint-Albert
 Victoriaville

Major intersections

See also
 List of Quebec provincial highways

References

External links 
 Provincial Route Map (Courtesy of the Quebec Ministry of Transportation) 
 Route 122 on Google Maps

122
Transport in Drummondville
Transport in Victoriaville